Borroto is a surname. Notable people with the surname include:

Evelina Borroto (born 1949), Cuban volleyball player
Luis Borroto (born 1982), Cuban baseball player
Mario Borroto, baseball player
Wenceslao Borroto (born 1958), Cuban rower

Spanish-language surnames